is an action role-playing game for the Famicom (NES). It was released in 1990 by Jaleco to a Japan-exclusive market. This video game has not been localized for any other region.

The game is part of the Ninja JaJaMaru-kun series, which had its debut on the Famicom and has had games on several different platforms.

Gameplay
JaJaMaru Gekimaden is an action role-playing game, with gameplay similar to The Legend of the Zelda. Players control the protagonist character  through towns, dungeons, and a world map. Each different type of map features top-down exploration. When moving through a dungeon, the protagonist will gradually recover health. The protagonist can equip different types of weapons and items that he can buy or find and use them during combat. Dungeons are made up of several rooms with enemies inside. Occasionally, an enemy will drop money when defeated, which can be used to buy items or heal health points at an inn.

Reception
In his review of the game, Kurt Kalata was negative about JaJaMaru Gekimaden. He complained that the puzzles are too simplistic, the enemies do not drop enough money, and that the music is "grating".

References

External links
JaJaMaru Gekimaden: Maboroshi no Kinmajou at GameFAQs

Role-playing video games
Jaleco games
Japan-exclusive video games
Video games about ninja
Nintendo Entertainment System games
Nintendo Entertainment System-only games
Action role-playing video games
Video games developed in Japan
Video games scored by Tsukasa Tawada
Video games set in feudal Japan
1990 video games